Hirnsdorf is a former municipality in the district of Weiz in the Austrian state of Styria. Since 2015, it is part of the municipality Feistritztal, in the Hartberg-Fürstenfeld District.

References

Cities and towns in Weiz District